The Jamaican owl (Asio grammicus) is a medium-sized owl that is endemic to the island of Jamaica.

Taxonomy and systematics

The Jamaican owl was previously considered the only member of the genus Pseudoscops, but phylogenetic analysis has reclassified it within Asio. It is monotypic.

Description 

This medium-sized owl has long ear tufts, dark brown eyes, and a rufous facial disk rimmed in black-flecked white. The adult's upperparts are rufous with fine dark brown vermiculation. The tail is also rufous, with dark brown bars. The breast and belly are rufous with narrow dark brown streaks. The juvenile's back is light grayish brown and the rest of its plumage is light cinnamon-buff.

Distribution and habitat

The Jamaican owl is found throughout the island of Jamaica. It inhabits a variety of open and semi-open landscapes such as open woodland, forest edges, plantations, and gardens.

Behavior

Feeding

The Jamaican owl is nocturnal and eats mainly large insects. Its diet also includes spiders, amphibians, lizards, and rodents. There is one record of its taking a bird, a Greater Antillean grackle (Quiscalus niger).

Breeding

The Jamaican owl's breeding phenology is poorly known. Nesting has been reported between March and October and egg-laying between December and June. It lays a clutch of two eggs in a tree cavity or a concealed tree-fork.

Vocalization

Adult Jamaican owls make a "[h]igh, quivering hoot and guttural growl".

Status

The IUCN has assessed the Jamaican owl as being of Least Concern. It is considered widespread and common, but "cutting of forest has probably reduced its range and numbers".

References

External links
Stamps (for Jamaica)
Jamaican Owl photo gallery VIREO
Photo-High Res--and Article owlpages

Jamaican owl
Endemic birds of Jamaica
Jamaican owl
Jamaican owl
Taxobox binomials not recognized by IUCN